Platform 5 is a publisher that specialises in rail transport books and magazines. The full name of the company is Platform 5 Publishing Limited. It was founded by Peter Fox and Neil Webster in 1977. It initially produced books with a target market of the rail enthusiast in the United Kingdom  before diversifying into magazines and also Europe. Today's Railways (later Today's Railways Europe) was launched in 1994 and Entrain (later Today's Railways UK) in 2002. During the COVID-19 pandemic it suspended publication of its journals. It is based in Sheffield.

References

Book publishing companies of the United Kingdom
Magazine publishing companies of the United Kingdom
Mass media in Sheffield
Publishing companies established in 1977
Rail transport publishing companies
1977 establishments in England

External Websites
  Platform 5 publishing Ltd website